Johnbaumite is a calcium arsenate hydroxide mineral. It was first described in 1980, where it appeared in Franklin Township, Somerset County, New Jersey. Johnbaumite was discovered at Harstigen mine in Sweden in the 19th century, but it was described as svabite.

Etymology 
It is named after geologist John Leach Baum (March 15, 1916 – October 16, 2011), who found the original specimen in 1944. He was a significant contributor to the geology and mineralogy of the Franklin deposit, and the Curator Emeritus at the Franklin Mineral Museum.

See also 
 Hydroxyapatite 
 Svabite

References

Further reading 
 Biagioni C, Bosi F, Hålenius U, Pasero M (2017) The crystal structure of turneaureite, Ca5(AsO4)3Cl, the arsenate analog of chlorapatite, and its relationships with the arsenate apatites johnbaumite and svabite, American Mineralogist, 102, 1981-1986
 Lee Y J, Stephens P W, Tang Y, Li W, Phillips B L, Parise J B, Reeder R J (2009) Arsenate substitution in hydroxylapatite: Structural characterization of the Ca5(PxAs1-xO4)3OH solid solution, American Mineralogist, 94, 666-675
 Zheng Y, Gao T, Gong Y, Ma S, Yang M, Chen P (2015) Electronic, vibrational and thermodynamic properties of Ca10(AsO4)6(OH)2: first principles study, The European Physical Journal of Applied Physics, 72, 1-7
 Anthony J W, Bideaux R A, Bladh K W, and Nichols M C (1990) Handbook of Mineralogy, Mineral Data Publishing, Tucson Arizona, USA, by permission of the Mineralogical Society of America.

Arsenate minerals
Franklin Township, Somerset County, New Jersey
Calcium minerals
Hexagonal minerals
Minerals in space group 176